The discography of the American country music duo The Bellamy Brothers consists of 30 studio albums and 72 singles. The duo charted for the first time in 1976 with "Let Your Love Flow", a #1 on the Billboard Hot 100. Although they only charted one other top 40 pop hit, they charted 26 top ten country hits.

Studio albums

1970s albums

1980s albums

1990s albums
{| class="wikitable plainrowheaders" style="text-align:center;"
|-
! rowspan="2" style="width:16em;"| Title
! rowspan="2" style="width:20em;"| Details
! colspan="1"| Peak positions
|- style="font-size:smaller;"
! width="65"| US Country
|-
! scope="row"| Reality Check
| 
 Release date: 1990
 Label: MCA Records/Curb
| 71
|-
! scope="row"| Rollin' Thunder
| 
 Release date: 1991
 Label: Atlantic Records
| —
|-
! scope="row"| Neon Cowboy
| 
 Release date: 1991
 Label: Bellamy Brothers Records
| —
|-
! scope="row"| Beggars and Heroes
| 
 Release date: 1992
 Label: Bellamy Brothers Records
| —
|-
! scope="row"| Nobody's Perfect
| 
 Release date: 1994
 Label: Bellamy Brothers Records
| —
|-
! scope="row"| Rip Off the Knob
| 
 Release date: 1994
 Label: Bellamy Brothers Records
| —
|-
! scope="row"| Take Me Home
| 
 Release date: 1994
 Label: Bellamy Brothers Records
| —
|-
! scope="row"| Sons of Beaches[B]
| 
 Release date: 1995
 Label: Bellamy Brothers Records
| —
|-
! scope="row"| Tropical Christmas
| 
 Release date: 1996
 Label: Bellamy Brothers Records
| —
|-
! scope="row"| Dancin| 
 Release date: 1996
 Label: Bellamy Brothers Records
| —
|-
! scope="row"| Over the Line
| 
 Release date: 1997
 Label: Bellamy Brothers Records
| —
|-
! scope="row"| Reggae Cowboys
| 
 Release date: 1998
 Label: Bellamy Brothers Records
| —
|-
! scope="row"| Live at Gilley's
| 
 Release date: 1999
 Label: Atlantic Records
| —
|-
! scope="row"| Lonely Planet
| 
 Release date: 1999
 Label: Blue Hat Records
| —
|-
| colspan="3" style="font-size:9pt"| "—" denotes releases that did not chart
|-
|}

2000s albums

2010s albums

2020s albums

Compilation albums

Singles
1970s singles

1980s singles

1990s singles

2000s singles

2010s singles

As a featured artist

Music videos

Notes

A ^ Let Your Love Flow was released in UK and Scandinavia in 1976, titled Bellamy Brothers featuring "Let Your Love Flow" (and Others), on the Warner Bros. Records/Curb/GS label.
B ^''' Sons of Beaches was also released under the title Native American'' on the Jupiter label in 1995.

References

External links
The Bellamy Brothers at AllMusic

Discographies of American artists
Country music discographies